The harpy eagle (Harpia harpyja) is a neotropical species of eagle. It is also called the American harpy eagle to distinguish it from the Papuan eagle, which is sometimes known as the New Guinea harpy eagle or Papuan harpy eagle. It is the largest and most powerful raptor found throughout its range, and among the largest extant species of eagles in the world. It usually inhabits tropical lowland rainforests in the upper (emergent) canopy layer. Destruction of its natural habitat has caused it to vanish from many parts of its former range, and it is nearly extirpated from much of Central America. In Brazil, the harpy eagle is also known as royal-hawk (in ). The genus Harpia, together with Harpyopsis and Morphnus, form the subfamily Harpiinae.

Taxonomy
The harpy eagle was first described by Carl Linnaeus in his landmark 1758 10th edition of Systema Naturae as Vultur harpyja, after the mythological beast harpy. The only member of the genus Harpia, the harpy eagle is most closely related to the crested eagle (Morphnus guianensis) and the New Guinea harpy eagle (Harpyopsis novaeguineae), the three composing the subfamily Harpiinae within the large family Accipitridae. Previously thought to be closely related, the Philippine eagle has been shown by DNA analysis to belong elsewhere in the raptor family, as it is related to the Circaetinae.

The specific name harpyja and the word "harpy" in the common name  both come from Ancient Greek harpyia. They refer to the harpies of Ancient Greek mythology. These were wind spirits that took the dead to Hades or Tartarus, and were said to have a body like a vulture and the face of a woman.

Description

The upperside of the harpy eagle is covered with slate-black feathers, and the underside is mostly white, except for the feathered tarsi, which are striped black. A broad black band across the upper breast separates the gray head from the white belly. The head is pale grey, and is crowned with a double crest. The upperside of the tail is black with three gray bands, while the underside of it is black with three white bands. The irises are gray or brown or red, the cere and bill are black or blackish and the tarsi and toes are yellow. The plumage of males and females is identical.

Female harpy eagles typically weigh . Being captive, this large female may not be representative of the weight possible in wild harpy eagles due to differences in the food availability. Mean talon size is 8.6 cm in males, and 12.3 cm in females.

It is sometimes cited as the largest eagle alongside the Philippine eagle, which is somewhat longer on average (between sexes averaging ) but weighs slightly less, and the Steller's sea eagle, which is perhaps slightly heavier on average (mean of three unsexed birds was ). The harpy eagle may be the largest bird species to reside in Central America, though large water birds such as American white pelicans (Pelecanus erythrorhynchos) and jabirus (Jabiru mycteria) have scarcely lower mean body masses. The wingspan of the harpy eagle is relatively small, though the wings are quite broad, an adaptation that increases maneuverability in forested habitats and is shared by other raptors in similar habitats. The wingspan of the harpy eagle is surpassed by several large eagles that live in more open habitats, such as those in the Haliaeetus and Aquila genera. The extinct Haast's eagle was significantly larger than all extant eagles, including the harpy.

This species is largely silent away from the nest. There, the adults give a penetrating, weak, melancholy scream, with the incubating males' call described as "whispy screaming or wailing". The females' calls while incubating are similar, but are lower-pitched. While approaching the nest with food, the male calls out "rapid chirps, goose-like calls, and occasional sharp screams". Vocalization in both parents decreases as the nestlings age, while the nestlings become more vocal. The nestlings call chi-chi-chi...chi-chi-chi-chi, seemingly in alarm in response to rain or direct sunlight. When humans approach the nest, the nestlings have been described as uttering croaks, quacks, and whistles.

Distribution and habitat
Rare throughout its range, the harpy eagle is found from Mexico, through Central America and into South America to as far south as Argentina. In rainforests, they live in the emergent layer. The eagle is most common in Brazil, where it is found across the entire national territory. With the exception of some areas of Panama, the species is almost extinct in Central America, subsequent to the logging of much of the rainforest there. The harpy eagle inhabits tropical lowland rainforests and may occur within such areas from the canopy to the emergent vegetation. Within the rainforest, they hunt in the canopy or sometimes on the ground, and perch on emergent trees looking for prey. They do not generally occur in disturbed areas, but regularly visit semiopen forest/pasture mosaic, mainly in hunting forays. Harpies, however, can be found flying over forest borders in a variety of habitats, such as cerrados, caatingas, buriti palm stands, cultivated fields, and cities. They have been found in areas where high-grade forestry is practiced.

Behavior

Feeding

Full grown harpy eagles are at the top of a food chain. They possess the largest talons of any living eagle and have been recorded as carrying prey weighing up to roughly half of their own body weight. This allows them to snatch from tree branches a live sloth and other large prey items. Most commonly, harpy eagles use perch hunting, in which they scan for prey activity while briefly perched between short flights from tree to tree. Upon spotting prey, the eagle quickly dives and grabs it. Sometimes, harpy eagles are "sit-and-wait" predators (common in forest-dwelling raptors), perching for long periods on a high point near an opening, a river, or a salt lick, where many mammals go to attain nutrients. On occasion, they may also hunt by flying within or above the canopy. They have also been observed tail-chasing: pursuing another bird in flight, rapidly dodging among trees and branches, a predation style common to hawks (genus Accipiter) that hunt birds.

A recent literature review and research using camera traps list a total of 116 prey species. Its main prey are tree-dwelling mammals, and a majority of the diet has been shown to focus on sloths. Research conducted by Aguiar-Silva between 2003 and 2005 in a nesting site in Parintins, Amazonas, Brazil, collected remains from prey offered to the nestling by its parents. The researchers found that 79% of the harpy's prey was accounted for by sloths from two species: 39% brown-throated sloth (Bradypus variegatus), and 40% Linnaeus's two-toed sloth (Choloepus didactylus). Similar research in Panama, where two captive-bred subadults were released, found that 52% of the male's captures and 54% of the female's were of two sloth species (brown-throated sloth and Hoffmann's two-toed sloth (Choloepus hoffmanni).

Another major prey of harpy eagles is monkeys. At several nests in Guyana, monkeys made up about 37% of the prey remains found at the nests. Similarly, cebid monkeys made up 35% of the remains found at 10 nests in Amazonian Ecuador. Monkeys regularly taken include capuchin monkeys, saki monkeys, howler monkeys, titi monkeys, squirrel monkeys, and spider monkeys. Smaller monkeys, such as tamarins and marmosets, are seemingly ignored as prey by this species. Larger howler monkeys are also taken, mainly Colombian red howler (Alouatta seniculus), but also Guyanan red howler (Alouatta macconnelli) and mantled howler (Alouatta palliata).

Other partially arboreal and even land mammals are also preyed on given the opportunity. In the Pantanal, a pair of nesting eagles preyed largely on the porcupine (Coendou prehensilis) and the agouti (Dasyprocta azarae). Both species of tamanduas (Tamandua mexicana & T. tetradactyla) are taken and armadillos, especially nine-banded armadillo (Dasypus novemcinctus) are also taken, as well as carnivores such as kinkajous (Potos flavus), coatis (Nasua nasua & N. narcia), tayras (Eira barbara), and occasionally margays (Leopardus wiedii) and crab-eating foxes (Cerdocyon thous). In one instant, an adult greater grison (Galictis vittata) was killed and partly consumed by subadult female harpy eagle. Other mammals, such as young peccaries, deer fawns, squirrels and opossums are additionally taken.

The eagle may also attack bird species such as macaws: At the Parintins research site, the red-and-green macaw (Ara chloropterus) made up for 0.4% of the prey base, with other birds amounting to 4.6%. Other parrots have also been preyed on, as well as cracids such as curassows and other birds like seriemas. In one occasion, dependent juvenile male eagle quickly learned how to hunt black vultures (Coragyps atratus) and accounted for 9 of our 10 records of harpy predation on vultures. Additional prey items reported include reptiles such as iguanas, tegus, snakes, and amphisbaenids. In Suriname, green iguanas (Iguana iguana) can be important prey source, and predation on yellow-footed tortoise (chelonoidis denticulata) have been recorded twice.

The eagle has been recorded as taking domestic livestock, including chickens, lambs, goats, and young pigs, but this is extremely rare under normal circumstances. They control the population of mesopredators such as capuchin monkeys, which prey extensively on bird's eggs and which (if not naturally controlled) may cause local extinctions of sensitive species.

Adult female harpies regularly grab large male howler or spider monkeys or mature sloths weighing  in flight and fly off without landing, an enormous feat of strength.

The prey brought to the nest by males averaged , while the prey brought to the nest by females averaged . Overall, harpy eagle  prey weigh between 0.3 kg to 6.5 kg, with the mean prey size equalling 2.6 ± 0.8 kg

Breeding
In ideal habitats, nests would be fairly close together. The harpy often builds its nest in the crown of the kapok tree, one of the tallest trees in South America. In many South American cultures,  cutting down the kapok tree is considered bad luck, which may help safeguard the habitat of this stately eagle. The bird also uses other huge trees on which to build its nest, such as the Brazil nut tree. A nesting site found in the Brazilian Pantanal was built on a cambará tree (Vochysia divergens).

No display is known between pairs of eagles, and they are believed to mate for life. A pair of harpy eagles usually only raises one chick every 2–3 years. After the first chick hatches, the second egg is ignored and normally fails to hatch unless the first egg perishes. The egg is incubated around 56 days. When the chick is 36 days old, it can stand and walk awkwardly. The chick fledges at the age of 6 months, but the parents continue to feed it for another 6 to 10 months. The male captures much of the food for the incubating female and later the eaglet, but also takes an incubating shift while the female forages and also brings prey back to the nest. Breeding maturity is not reached until birds are 4 to 6 years of age. Adults can be aggressive toward humans who disturb the nesting site or appear to be a threat to their young.

Status and conservation

Although the harpy eagle still occurs over a considerable range, its distribution and populations have dwindled considerably. It is threatened primarily by habitat loss due to the expansion of logging, cattle ranching, agriculture, and prospecting. Secondarily, it is threatened by being hunted as an actual threat to livestock and/or a supposed one to human life, due to its great size. Although not actually known to prey on humans and only rarely on domestic stock, the species' large size and nearly fearless behaviour around humans reportedly make it an "irresistible target" for hunters. Such threats apply throughout its range, in large parts of which the bird has become a transient sight only; in Brazil, it was all but wiped out from the Atlantic rainforest and is only found in appreciable numbers in the most remote parts of the Amazon basin; a Brazilian journalistic account of the mid-1990s already complained that at the time it was only found in significant numbers in Brazilian territory on the northern side of the Equator. Scientific 1990s records, however, suggest that the harpy Atlantic Forest population may be migratory. Subsequent research in Brazil has established that, as of 2009, the harpy eagle, outside the Brazilian Amazon, is critically endangered in Espírito Santo, São Paulo and Paraná, endangered in Rio de Janeiro, and probably extirpated in Rio Grande do Sul (where a recent (March 2015) record was set for the Parque Estadual do Turvo) and Minas Gerais – the actual size of their total population in Brazil is unknown.

Globally, the harpy eagle is considered near threatened by IUCN and threatened with extinction by CITES (appendix I). The Peregrine Fund until recently considered it a "conservation-dependent species", meaning it depends on a dedicated effort for captive breeding and release to the wild, as well as habitat protection, to prevent it from reaching endangered status, but now has accepted the near threatened status. The harpy eagle is considered critically endangered in Mexico and Central America, where it has been extirpated in most of its former range; in Mexico, it used to be found as far north as Veracruz, but today probably occurs only in Chiapas in the Selva Zoque. It is considered as near threatened or vulnerable in most of the South American portion of its range; at the southern extreme of its range, in Argentina, it is found only in the Parana Valley forests at the province of Misiones. It has disappeared from El Salvador, and almost so from Costa Rica.

National initiatives
Various initiatives for restoration of the species are in place in various countries. Since 2002, the Peregrine Fund initiated a conservation and research program for the harpy eagle in the Darién Province. A similar—and grander, given the dimensions of the countries involved—research project is occurring in Brazil, at the National Institute of Amazonian Research, through which 45 known nesting locations (updated to 62, only three outside the Amazonian basin and all three inactive) are being monitored by researchers and volunteers from local communities. A harpy eagle chick has been fitted with a radio transmitter that allows it to be tracked for more than three years via a satellite signal sent to the Brazilian National Institute for Space Research. Also, a photographic recording of a nest site in the Carajás National Forest was made for the Brazilian edition of National Geographic Magazine.

In Panama, the Peregrine Fund carried out a captive-breeding and release project that released a total of 49 birds in Panama and Belize. The Peregrine Fund has also carried out a research and conservation project on this species since the year 2000, making it the longest-running study on harpy eagles.

In Belize, the Belize Harpy Eagle Restoration Project began in 2003 with the collaboration of Sharon Matola, founder and director of the Belize Zoo and the Peregrine Fund. The goal of this project was the re-establishment of the harpy eagle within Belize. The population of the eagle declined as a result of forest fragmentation, shooting, and nest destruction, resulting in near extirpation of the species. Captive-bred harpy eagles were released in the Rio Bravo Conservation and Management Area in Belize, chosen for its quality forest habitat and linkages with Guatemala and Mexico. Habitat linkage with Guatemala and Mexico were important for conservation of quality habitat and the harpy eagle on a regional level. As of November 2009, 14 harpy eagles have been released and are monitored by the Peregrine Fund, through satellite telemetry.

In January 2009, a chick from the all-but-extirpated population in the Brazilian state of Paraná was hatched in captivity at the preserve kept in the vicinity of the Itaipu Dam by the Brazilian/Paraguayan state-owned company Itaipu Binacional. In September 2009, an adult female, after being kept captive for 12 years in a private reservation, was fitted with a radio transmitter before being restored to the wild in the vicinity of the Pau Brasil National Park (formerly Monte Pascoal NP), in the state of Bahia.

In December 2009, a 15th harpy eagle was released into the Rio Bravo Conservation and Management Area in Belize. The release was set to tie in with the United Nations Climate Change Conference 2009, in Copenhagen. The 15th eagle, nicknamed "Hope" by the Peregrine officials in Panama, was the "poster child" for forest conservation in Belize, a developing country, and the importance of these activities in relation to climate change. The event received coverage from Belize's major media entities, and was supported and attended by the U.S. Ambassador to Belize, Vinai Thummalapally, and British High Commissioner to Belize, Pat Ashworth.

In Colombia, as of 2007, an adult male and a subadult female confiscated from wildlife trafficking were restored to the wild and monitored in Paramillo National Park in Córdoba, and another couple was being kept in captivity at a research center for breeding and eventual release. A monitoring effort with the help of volunteers from local Native American communities is also being made in Ecuador, including the joint sponsorship of various Spanish universities—this effort being similar to another one going on since 1996 in Peru, centred around a native community in the Tambopata Province, Madre de Dios Region. Another monitoring project, begun in 1992, was operating as of 2005 in the state of Bolívar, Venezuela.

In human culture

The harpy eagle is the national bird of Panama and is depicted on the coat of arms of Panama.  The 15th harpy eagle released in Belize, named "Hope", was dubbed "Ambassador for Climate Change", in light of the United Nations Climate Change Conference 2009.

The bird appeared on the reverse side of the Venezuelan Bs.F 2,000 note.

The harpy eagle was the inspiration behind the design of Fawkes the Phoenix in the Harry Potter film series. A live harpy eagle was used to portray the now-extinct Haast's eagle in BBC's Monsters We Met.

References and notes

External links

 Harpy eagle Facts and Pictures on AnimalSpot.net
 Harpy eagle videos, photos & sounds on the Internet Bird Collection
 San Diego Zoo info about the harpy eagle
 Harpy eagle information and photo 
 The Peregrine Fund-Harpy Eagle

harpy eagle
harpy eagle
Birds of Central America
Birds of Mexico
Birds of Panama
Birds of the Amazon Basin
Birds of Brazil
Birds of Colombia
Birds of Venezuela
Birds of the Guianas
Birds of prey of South America
harpy eagle
Endangered biota of Mexico
National symbols of Panama
harpy eagle